Acraea kuekenthali is a butterfly in the family Nymphalidae. It is found in southern Tanzania and the Democratic Republic of the Congo (Shaba).

Taxonomy
It is a member of the Acraea circeis species group - but see also Pierre & Bernaud, 2014  where it is treated as a subspecies of Acraea conradti.

References

Butterflies described in 1922
kuekenthali